The Bislett Games is an annual track and field meeting at the Bislett Stadium in Oslo, Norway. Previously one of the IAAF Golden League events, it is now part of the Diamond League.

History

The first international athletics meeting at Bislett was held in 1924. Until 1937 the competitions are known as "The American Meetings". Different organizers staged the meetings between 1947 and 1965 until the three athletics associations BUL, Vidar and Tjalve formed the Bislett Alliance. At this year Arne Haukvik founded the Bislett Games. He was a former politician and director of the meeting, who used to invite the athletes, sponsors and the press to his home for his traditional "strawberry party" the day before the event each year. He died of cancer in 2002 at age 76. The tradition however is continued.

Bislett Stadium was used for speed skating events at the Olympics, but nowadays it is better known for its Bislett Games athletics meeting. Bislett Games attract the best track and field athletes from all over the world, and 65 world records have been set on its forgiving, brick-coloured track so far. Due to the building of the new Bislett Stadium in Oslo, which started in April 2004, the 2004 edition of the traditional athletics meeting was staged on Fana stadion in Bergen under the name Bergen Bislett Games.

In 2009, a severe storm delayed proceedings and even caused damage to the track-side clock display. Sanya Richards recorded the fastest women's 400 metres time since 2006 while the Dream Mile brought a number of records with winner Deresse Mekonnen improving upon his Ethiopian record, Kenyan William Biwott Tanui setting a world junior record and third-placed Augustine Choge beating his personal best. Former javelin winners Andreas Thorkildsen and Tero Pitkämäki continued their five-year shared dominance of the Bislett Games, with Pitkämäki taking the victory this time.

Alternative events 
During 2020 the COVID-19 pandemic prevented Bislett Games from taking place, instead an event called Impossible Games was held. In 2021 there were still restrictions which caused the main event to be postponed. A restricted event called Night of Highlights was held instead on June 4th 2021.

World records
Over the course of its history, numerous world records have been set at the Games and former athletics meetings at Bislett stadium. 1985 three new records was set at the same evening.

Bislett Games

Differently named meetings

American meetings

Meeting records

Men

Women

See also
Dream Mile

References

External links

 Diamond League – Oslo Official Web Site

Diamond League
Recurring sporting events established in 1965
International sports competitions in Oslo
Athletics competitions in Norway
IAAF Golden League
1965 establishments in Norway
IAAF World Outdoor Meetings